Iván Calderón Marrero (born January 27, 1975) is a Puerto Rican former professional boxer who competed from 2001 to 2012. He is a two-weight world champion, having held the WBO mini flyweight title from 2003 to 2007 (making eleven successful defenses and being recognized as super champion by the organization), and the WBO,  Ring magazine, and lineal light flyweight titles from 2007 to 2010 (making six successful defenses). Additionally, his August 2010 bout against Giovani Segura was named fight of the year by  Ring magazine. As an amateur Calderón represented Puerto Rico in international competitions, including the 2000 Olympics.

Personal life 
Iván Calderón was born in the municipality of Guaynabo, Puerto Rico and currently resides in a sector called "Las Americas" in Bayamón. Iván had a troubling childhood surrounded by violence and problems, which according to him has helped him develop more patience which has helped him in his personal life. Calderón attended middle school in José Nevárez Landrón School, located in Toa Baja, Puerto Rico. His first wife was Wilma Laguna, with whom he has two children, Wilvani and Iván junior.  In an interview with El Nuevo Día he noted that he engaged Laguna on August 29, 1997 following a quinceañero and the couple married on February 5, 1999. According to him the couple had some disagreements when they met, based on some attitudes he presented, he also notes that he felt she was arrogant at first. However, on one day he decided to propose to her and after four months of establishing a relationship the couple moved in together. Calderón expressed that he is "too much of a house man" and claims that as a result of a rule established by his former wife any kind of non-familiar activity is prohibited on Sundays. In January 2009, it was made public that Calderón and Laguna had established a divorce process.

He is married to A. Maldonado Garcia Dennisse; a prepared and educated woman. Maldonado has his Bachelors of Business Administration from the University Ana G. Mendez. Currently has a daughter named Diannelys E. Calderon.

Calderón spends the money that he earns boxing on properties and he is associated with a company dedicated to satellite vehicle tracking. He is employed by the City of Guaynabo's Department of Sports and Recreation and has been involved in several youth-oriented charities in his native Puerto Rico, including lecturing in island schools and co-sponsoring a massive gift-giving effort in the town of Loíza's Three Kings festival in early 2006. As a result of his charitable efforts with children that live in poor communities he was awarded a special award at the World Boxing Organization's 2007 annual convention.

On November 16, 2011 Federal agents in Puerto Rico seized more than $4 million worth cocaine from a house owned by Calderon. Drug Enforcement Administration spokeswoman Laila Rico said 225 kilograms (nearly 500 pounds) of cocaine were found when agents raided the house in the coastal town of Humacao. Calderon denied knowledge of the narcotics and was never formally charged with an offence.

Amateur career 
In 1993, Calderón defeated Miguel Cotto in the light flyweight division, when both boxers were in the early stages of amateur experience. Following this, both athletes developed a close friendship. Calderón lost to Brian Viloria once during his amateur boxing career, but defeated him three times before turning professional. In addition, Calderon competed as an international amateur in several tournaments, including the following:

 1999 3rd place as a Light Flyweight at Pan-American Games in Winnipeg, Canada. Results were:
 Defeated Wilfrido Valez (Colombia) points
 Defeated Mendeo Winston (Dominican Republic) points
 Lost to Maikro Romero (Cuba) points
 2000 represented Puerto Rico as a light flyweight at the 2000 Sydney Olympic Games. Result was:
 Lost to Masara La Paene (Indonesia) points

Professional career 
After turning professional, Calderón was frequently showcased on ESPN's Friday Night Fights show. On July 1, 2001, Calderón defeated José Manuel Ramírez by unanimous decision. During this fight, he suffered an open wound over his right eyebrow, which required surgery. On May 3, 2003, Calderón became a world champion for the first time, defeating Eduardo Marquez by a technical decision in nine rounds at Las Vegas, as part of the de la Hoya-Campas undercard, to win the World Boxing Organization's world strawweight title. He had dropped Marquez twice before the end of the fight. Calderón retained his title by a 12-round decision in his first defense, on September 5, over Lorenzo Trejo of Mexico, at Caguas, Puerto Rico. In his second defense, held at Bayamón, he defeated former world champion Alex Sanchez by a unanimous twelve-round decision. On March 20, 2004, he retained the championship with an eleventh-round knockout win over former International Boxing Federation world champion Edgar Cardenas, in Guaynabo. Before that fight, Calderón obtained his high school credit diploma.

On July 31, 2004, as part of the Morales-Hernandez undercard in Las Vegas, he retained his title once again, with a twelve-round decision win over former world champion Roberto Leyva. On November 23 of that year, he made his fifth defense, defeating Nicaraguan Carlos Fajardo by a twelve-round unanimous decision. As part of the Barrera-Morales III undercard. His fight with Fajardo was shown live on HBO's Pay per view. On April 30, of 2005, he retained the title with an eighth-round knockout victory over Noel Tunacao, a member of the Tunacao boxing family of the Philippines. On September 25, he retained his title for the seventh time, with a twelve-round unanimous decision over Mexico's Gerardo Verde, at Atlantic City, New Jersey.

On December 10, 2004, Calderón retained the title again, this time with a twelve-round unanimous decision over former world champion Daniel Reyes. Calderón began 2006 by defending his title successfully on February 18, with a twelve-round unanimous decision over Isaac Bustos in Las Vegas. He would defend his title successfully twice in 2006 after his fight with Isaac Bustos. On April 29 against Miguel Tellez winning the fight by technical knock out thus gaining his sixth knock out victory. He finished his boxing year on October 21 by defeating José Luis Varela of Venezuela by unanimous decision.  Following this fight the World Boxing Organization recognized him as a WBO Super Champion for reaching ten successful title defenses. On his first fight of 2007 that took place on March 28 in Baranquilla, Colombia Calderón defeated Ronald Barrera by split decision. Following his fight against Barrera Calderón announced that he was interested in changing weight and challenge one of the champions in the light flyweight division thus finishing his minimum weight run after twelve successful defenses of the division's title.

During this timeframe, Freddie Roach selected Calderón as a sparring partner for Oscar De La Hoya. The reason for this was that the trainer was seeking a fast adversary. On November 16, 2008, Roach rememorated the event in his blog for The Ring, stating that "Calderon slapped Oscar around like it was unbelievable." The trainer also noted that he asked De La Hoya to pursue the offense, but the boxer's attempts were unsuccessful. In response, Calderón expressed that he participated in "three or four rounds" of sparring, during which he "gave him problems" and "made him uncomfortable", while De La Hoya "tried to hit" but seemed "out of timing". Similarly, Calderón competed against Shane Mosley in a four-round sparring match. The session was in preparation, serving as training for the first of a series of fights against Hugo Cázares. During the actual contest, Mosley had problems landing punches due to his adversary's speed. While Calderón recognized that his opponent's weight made the practice feel like a complete workout. Subsequently, Mosley expressed that "Iván uses the angles very well and sparring against someone that moves so much is fun". Calderón noted that competing against a heavier boxer helped him adjust to the pressure that could be presented by Cázares.

Light flyweight division 
On August 25, 2007, Calderón defeated Hugo Cázares by split decision to become the WBO and Lineal Light Flyweight Champion. Calderón entered the ring accompanied by a display of fireworks, before a crowd that featured several media personalities, including Oscar De La Hoya. The size difference between both pugilists was evident since the moment that they stood next to each other prior to the beginning of the fight. Early in the fight Calderón's tactic consisted of connecting fast consecutive combinations while avoiding Cázares' punches. With this strategy he managed to stun Cazares with uppercuts and straight punches. During the fight the crowd displayed support for Calderón, at one point chanting "Olé" when his adversary's punches missed. In the third round Cázares displayed a more fluid offensive, but in the fifth he presented a strategy that consisted of only throwing power punches which seemed to benefit Calderón. In the seventh round Ivan's offensive pace slowed which benefited Hugo who improved on the offensive aspect. In the eighth round Cázares connected several hard punches which led to Calderón to rely on holds to slow his offense, in this round Cázares scored a knockdown. In the ninth he was in a defensive stance, and during the last rounds he continued this pattern and only connected solidly in the tenth round while Cázares missed several of the punches he threw. At the conclusion of the fight the judges awarded scores of 116-111 for Cázares and 115-112 twice for Calderón. With this victory he became the eleventh Puerto Rican boxer to win multiple world championships and unified this championship with the minimum division's one until he vacated it following the announcement that he was going to continue in the light flyweight division. The Ring also recognized Calderón as their champion, dethroning Cázares.

Calderón was successful on his first light flyweight title defense when he defeated Juan Esquer in a card that took place on December 1, 2007 in New Mexico. During the course of the fight Esquer was more active offensively. During the first four rounds of the match Calderón used his boxing skills to avoid being hit by the punches thrown by Esquer. From the fifth round onwards Calderón proceeded to exchange combinations of punches with Esquer, eventually gaining control of the fight's tempo. The fight lasted twelve rounds and Iván won the fight by unanimous decision with the judges awarding scores of 116-112, 118-110 and 115-113. Calderón's second defense in the light flyweight division took place on April 4, 2008, where he defeated Nelson Dieppa by unanimous decision. The three judges awarded him identical scores of 120-108.

Following a protest, the World Boxing Organization named Cázares the mandatory challenger for the championship. The event was scheduled for August 30, 2008. Calderón entered the ring dressed as a matador in reference to his boxing style, which provoked "Olé" chants from the public. In the early stages, the fight's pattern was similar to the first meeting. Calderón relied on counter punching while boxing to avoid Cázares' offensive. Late in the first round, the challenger fell following a combination, but the referee declared that it was an accidental slip. In the following rounds, Cázares tried pressuring in the offensive, but Calderón continued boxing and held his opponent if approached. The challenger was momentarily stunned by an uppercut in the final seconds of the third episode. Cázares' technique in the next two rounds consisted of throwing punches to the body, while his offensive to the head was being stopped by his opponent's forearms. In the sixth round, Calderón focused on his defense, slowing the pace of his offensive. In the seventh episode, an accidental head clash opened a laceration in Calderón's forehead. Who was examined by the ringside doctor, after expressing that he was feeling disoriented. The physician recommended stopping the fight. Due to the circumstances, the outcome was decided by the judges' score cards, which favored Calderón 67-66 and 68-65 twice. Following the event, he announced his intention to participate in a unification match against one of the other light flyweight champions. Due to the nature of this injury, the Puerto Rico Boxing Commission prohibited Calderón participation in any card within 120 days. Two weeks after the contest, the wound was reopened and he underwent plastic surgery to prevent reinjury. On September 23, 2008, Peter Rivera announced that Calderón was expected to return between January and February 2009. Rivera noted that the fight would be against one of the other light flyweight champions, most likely César Canchila, citing that although both Ulises Solís and Edgar Sosa were approached, with both claiming to be available, neither one actually pursued serious negotiations. He subsequently stated that negotiations had been extended to Solís' representatives, but that those of Sosa still declined, citing that "[He] is a fighter that has always refused to fight with Iván. His managers don't want to sacrifice him and prefer to keep him in Mexico competing in soft fights." In the meanwhile, he received a homage as part of the Dominican Parade in San Juan, serving as Padrino Internacional (lit. "International Godfather") along Juan Manuel López.

On June 13, 2009, Calderón defended the championship against Rodel Mayol. During the first stage, both pugilists fought in the middle of the ring, while he focused on attacking the body while the challenger employed jabs. During the second and third rounds, Mayol pressured the offensive, managing to land a moderate number of punches. In the fourth round, Calderón began pursuing the offensive, while avoiding Mayol's punches. This continued in the following chapter, but a head clash opened another laceration on his forehead, he continued the contest, but was more aggressive from this point onwards. Calderón's corner tried to stop the bleeding, but the referee suspended the contest during the sixth round after these attempts proven unsuccessful. The fight was declared a technical draw, with both fighters receiving a 58-56 card while the third judge scored in 57-57. An immediate rematch was scheduled three months later. Calderón began this contest by effectively avoiding Mayol's constant attack, while throwing limited punches. This pattern continued during the following three rounds. In the fifth, Mayol connected his best punch of the fight, winning the round. To retaliate, Calderón became more aggressive, throwing more combinations. The seventh round began with exchanges from both boxers, but a head clash opens another laceration that stops the fight. The contest was declared a technical decision, with the judges offering scores of 68-65 twice for Calderón and 68-65 for Mayol.

Retirement
On October 29, 2012, almost a month after his last fight, Calderón officially announced his retirement from professional boxing. The announcement was made during the inauguration of the Félix Pagán Pintor Gymnasium in Guaynabo, Puerto Rico. Calderón will now work as administrator of the gymnasium.

Professional boxing record 

{|class="wikitable" style="text-align:center"
|-
!
!Result
!Record
!Opponent
!Type
!Round, time
!Date
!Location
!Notes
|-
|39
|Loss
|35–3–1
|style="text-align:left;"| Moisés Fuentes
|TKO
|5 (12), 
|6 Oct 2012
|style="text-align:left;"| 
|style="text-align:left;"|
|-
|38
|Win
|35–2–1
|style="text-align:left;"| Felipe Rivas
|SD
|12
|29 Oct 2011
|style="text-align:left;"| 
|style="text-align:left;"|
|-
|37
|Loss
|34–2–1
|style="text-align:left;"| Giovani Segura
|KO
|3 (12), 
|2 Apr 2011
|style="text-align:left;"| 
|style="text-align:left;"|
|-
|36
|Loss
|34–1–1
|style="text-align:left;"| Giovani Segura
|KO
|8 (12), 
|28 Aug 2010
|style="text-align:left;"| 
|style="text-align:left;"|
|-
|35
|Win
|34–0–1
|style="text-align:left;"| Jesus Iribe
|UD
|12
|12 Jun 2010
|style="text-align:left;"| 
|style="text-align:left;"|
|-
|34
|Win
|33–0–1
|style="text-align:left;"| Rodel Mayol
|TD
|7 (12), 
|12 Sep 2009
|style="text-align:left;"| 
|style="text-align:left;"|
|-
|33
|Draw
|32–0–1
|style="text-align:left;"| Rodel Mayol
|
|6 (12), 
|13 Jun 2009
|style="text-align:left;"| 
|style="text-align:left;"|
|-
|32
|Win
|32–0
|style="text-align:left;"| Hugo Cázares
|TD
|7 (12), 
|30 Aug 2008
|style="text-align:left;"| 
|style="text-align:left;"|
|-
|31
|Win
|31–0
|style="text-align:left;"| Nelson Dieppa
|UD
|12
|5 Apr 2008
|style="text-align:left;"| 
|style="text-align:left;"|
|-
|30
|Win
|30–0
|style="text-align:left;"| Juan Esquer
|UD
|12
|1 Dec 2007
|style="text-align:left;"| 
|style="text-align:left;"|
|-
|29
|Win
|29–0
|style="text-align:left;"| Hugo Cázares
|SD
|12
|25 Aug 2007
|style="text-align:left;"| 
|style="text-align:left;"|
|-
|28
|Win
|28–0
|style="text-align:left;"| Ronald Barrera
|
|12
|28 Apr 2007
|style="text-align:left;"| 
|style="text-align:left;"|
|-
|27
|Win
|27–0
|style="text-align:left;"| José Luis Varela
|UD
|12
|21 Oct 2006
|style="text-align:left;"| 
|style="text-align:left;"|
|-
|26
|Win
|26–0
|style="text-align:left;"| Miguel Tellez
|TKO
|9 (12), 
|29 Apr 2006
|style="text-align:left;"| 
|style="text-align:left;"|
|-
|25
|Win
|25–0
|style="text-align:left;"| Isaac Bustos
|UD
|12
|18 Feb 2006
|style="text-align:left;"| 
|style="text-align:left;"|
|-
|24
|Win
|24–0
|style="text-align:left;"| Daniel Reyes
|UD
|12
|10 Dec 2005
|style="text-align:left;"| 
|style="text-align:left;"|
|-
|23
|Win
|23–0
|style="text-align:left;"| Gerardo Verde
|UD
|12
|25 Jun 2005
|style="text-align:left;"| 
|style="text-align:left;"|
|-
|22
|Win
|22–0
|style="text-align:left;"| Noel Tunacao
|TKO
|8 (12), 
|30 Apr 2005
|style="text-align:left;"| 
|style="text-align:left;"|
|-
|21
|Win
|21–0
|style="text-align:left;"| Carlos Fajardo
|UD
|12
|27 Nov 2004
|style="text-align:left;"| 
|style="text-align:left;"|
|-
|20
|Win
|20–0
|style="text-align:left;"| Roberto Carlos Leyva
|UD
|12
|31 Jul 2004
|style="text-align:left;"| 
|style="text-align:left;"|
|-
|19
|Win
|19–0
|style="text-align:left;"| Edgar Cardenas
|KO
|11 (12), 
|20 Mar 2004
|style="text-align:left;"| 
|
|-
|18
|Win
|18–0
|style="text-align:left;"| Alex Sánchez
|UD
|12
|6 Dec 2003
|style="text-align:left;"| 
|style="text-align:left;"|
|-
|17
|Win
|17–0
|style="text-align:left;"| Lorenzo Trejo
|UD
|12
|5 Sep 2003
|style="text-align:left;"| 
|style="text-align:left;"|
|-
|16
|Win
|16–0
|style="text-align:left;"| Eduardo Ray Marquez
|
|9 (12), 
|3 May 2003
|style="text-align:left;"| 
|style="text-align:left;"|
|-
|15
|Win
|15–0
|style="text-align:left;"| Juan Carlos Perez
|UD
|10
|7 Mar 2003
|style="text-align:left;"| 
|
|-
|14
|Win
|14–0
|style="text-align:left;"| Valentin Leon
|UD
|10
|20 Dec 2002
|style="text-align:left;"| 
|
|-
|13
|Win
|13–0
|style="text-align:left;"| Lee Marvin Sandoval
|UD
|12
|22 Nov 2002
|style="text-align:left;"| 
|style="text-align:left;"|
|-
|12
|Win
|12–0
|style="text-align:left;"| Roberto Gomez
|UD
|10
|6 Sep 2002
|style="text-align:left;"| 
|
|-
|11
|Win
|11–0
|style="text-align:left;"| Alejandro Moreno
|UD
|10
|30 Jul 2002
|style="text-align:left;"| 
|
|-
|10
|Win
|10–0
|style="text-align:left;"| Carlos Lopez
|UD
|4
|3 May 2002
|style="text-align:left;"| 
|
|-
|9
|Win
|9–0
|style="text-align:left;"| Jorge Romero
|TKO
|4 (8)
|1 Mar 2002
|style="text-align:left;"| 
|
|-
|8
|Win
|8–0
|style="text-align:left;"| Mike Thomas
|UD
|8
|11 Jan 2002
|style="text-align:left;"| 
|
|-
|7
|Win
|7–0
|style="text-align:left;"| Jorge Romero
|UD
|8
|28 Oct 2001
|style="text-align:left;"| 
|
|-
|6
|Win
|6–0
|style="text-align:left;"| Alberto Rossel
|UD
|8
|26 Aug 2001
|style="text-align:left;"| 
|
|-
|5
|Win
|5–0
|style="text-align:left;"| Jose Manuel Ramirez
|UD
|6
|1 Jul 2001
|style="text-align:left;"| 
|
|-
|4
|Win
|4–0
|style="text-align:left;"| Iran Ethridge
|
|1 (4), 
|20 May 2001
|style="text-align:left;"| 
|
|-
|3
|Win
|3–0
|style="text-align:left;"| Benjamin Escobia
|UD
|4
|29 Apr 2001
|style="text-align:left;"| 
|
|-
|2
|Win
|2–0
|style="text-align:left;"| Arturo Velazquez
|
|4
|25 Mar 2001
|style="text-align:left;"| 
|
|-
|1
|Win
|1–0
|style="text-align:left;"| Sergio Diaz
|
|1 (4), 
|17 Feb 2001
|style="text-align:left;"| 
|

See also 
List of WBO world champions
List of Puerto Ricans
Boxing at the 2000 Summer Olympics
List of Puerto Rican boxing world champions

References

External links 
 
 Iván Calderón Video Interview @ FightFan.com

1975 births
Living people
People from Guaynabo, Puerto Rico
Boxers at the 1999 Pan American Games
Boxers at the 2000 Summer Olympics
World light-flyweight boxing champions
Olympic boxers of Puerto Rico
World Boxing Organization champions
Mini-flyweight boxers
World mini-flyweight boxing champions
Puerto Rican male boxers
Pan American Games bronze medalists for Puerto Rico
Pan American Games medalists in boxing
Central American and Caribbean Games bronze medalists for Puerto Rico
Competitors at the 1998 Central American and Caribbean Games
Central American and Caribbean Games medalists in boxing
Medalists at the 1999 Pan American Games